A protégé is an apprentice or recipient of mentoring.

Protégé may refer to:

Art, entertainment, and media
 Protégé (comics), a fictional Marvel Comics character 
 Protégé (film) (Moon To), a 2007 Hong Kong film 
 The Protégé, a 2021 U.S. film
 Protégé (TV series), a Philippine reality-based talent search television show created by GMA Network

History

 Protégé system in Morocco, in which protégés were individuals associated with foreign consuls and given special privileges and protections

Brands and enterprises
 Protégé (software), a free, open source ontology editor and a knowledge acquisition system
 Mazda Protegé, known variously as the Familia, 323, Mizer, GLC, Astina, Etude, etc.
 Grupo Protege, a Brazilian private security company
 Protégé Partners, a U.S. hedge fund investment firm
 Protégé Corporation, a team and company from the first season of the U.S. version of The Apprentice

See also

 Toshiba Portégé, laptop computer